Li Canming (born 19 January 2000) is a Chinese footballer currently playing as a forward for Dongguan United.

Career statistics

Club
.

References

2000 births
Living people
Chinese footballers
Association football forwards
China League Two players
Guangzhou F.C. players
21st-century Chinese people